Bezirganlar can refer to:

 Bezirganlar, Bayramiç
 Bezirganlar, Biga